"It's Been Awhile" is a song by American rock band Staind. It was released on March 27, 2001, as the lead single from their third studio album, Break the Cycle (2001).

The song is Staind's most successful and is their best-known song, becoming a number five hit on the Billboard Hot 100 in October 2001—their only song to reach the top 10. It spent a second-best 20 weeks at number one on the Billboard Hot Mainstream Rock Tracks chart (behind "Loser" by 3 Doors Down) and a then-record 16 weeks at number one on the Billboard Hot Modern Rock Tracks chart. Worldwide, the single became a top-20 hit in Ireland, the Netherlands, New Zealand, and the United Kingdom.

The song was featured as a playable track on the Nintendo GameCube video game Donkey Konga 2.

Background
Aaron Lewis originally wrote this song around 1996 along with "Outside" slightly prior to the release of Dysfunction and performed it with a short-lived acoustic side project called J-CAT, before abruptly shelving it until 2000 during the recording sessions of Break the Cycle.

Reception
Eric Aiese of Billboard reviewed the song favorably, saying that the group handles the ballad well and packs "a lot of punch into the cut." Aiese said that the song "may be the group's greatest splash yet."

Music video
The music video had its world premiere on MTV's Total Request Live program on April 13, 2001.  The music video begins with Aaron Lewis going through some old photographs, one of which is a picture of his wife. The video switches between him writing a letter to his wife and the band performing in a room full of candles. There are brief shots of Aaron alone in the streets and looking at himself in the mirror while having second thoughts. Throughout the video, Aaron is seen smoking cigarettes. At the end of the video, one of those cigarettes falls onto the floor and burns down his apartment.

The video was directed by Limp Bizkit frontman Fred Durst.

Track listings

UK CD1
 "It's Been Awhile" (clean edit) – 3:51
 "Suffocate" – 3:17
 "It's Been Awhile" (album version) – 4:25
 "It's Been Awhile" (enhanced video)

UK CD2
 "It's Been Awhile" (live version) – 4:40
 "Spleen" – 4:40
 "It's Been Awhile" (acoustic version) – 4:31

European CD single
 "It's Been Awhile" (edit) – 3:56
 "It's Been Awhile" (acoustic version) – 4:31

Australian maxi-CD single
 "It's Been Awhile" (edit) – 3:56
 "It's Been Awhile" (acoustic version) – 4:31
 "Suffocate" – 3:17

Charts and certifications

Weekly charts

Year-end charts

Certifications

Release history

References

2000s ballads
2001 singles
2001 songs
Elektra Records singles
Flip Records (1994) singles
Music videos directed by Fred Durst
Rock ballads
Song recordings produced by Josh Abraham
Songs written by Aaron Lewis
Songs written by Mike Mushok
Staind songs